Procambarus vioscai is a species of crayfish found in United States.

Subspecies
Procambarus vioscai paynei  - east of Mississippi River.

References

External links

Freshwater crustaceans of North America
Cambaridae